Susan Swain (born December 23, 1954) is an American journalist, author and the co-CEO of C-SPAN.

Early years
Swain was born December 23, 1954, in Philadelphia, Pennsylvania. Swain was educated in public schools in the Philadelphia area. Swain studied at the University of Scranton where she graduated with B.A. in communications. In 1999, the school awarded her an honorary doctorate.

Career

Swain started with C-SPAN in 1982. She began as a producer on a part-time basis when C-SPAN was just one channel. As time went on she graduated to other assignments, such as full-time producer, programmer, and moderator for Washington Journal, C-SPAN's morning call-in/interview program. Swain eventually was promoted to vice president of corporate communications, senior vice president, executive vice president. Swain became a director of Discovery Communications, Inc. on December 7, 2016. With the retirement of network founder Brian Lamb, she is now co-president and CEO of C-SPAN.

Bibliography
 First Ladies: Presidential Historians on the Lives of 45 Iconic American Women (PublicAffairs)
 The Supreme Court: A C-SPAN Book, Featuring the Justices in their Own Words (PublicAffairs)
 Abraham Lincoln: Great American Historians on Our Sixteenth President (PublicAffairs)
 The presidents: Noted Historians Rank America's Best—and Worst—Chief Executives (PublicAffairs)

References

External links

Susan Swain's oral history for The Cable Center's Hauser Oral History Collection, December 13, 2017

American women journalists
Living people
Year of birth missing (living people)
C-SPAN people
21st-century American women